Erkki Olavi Hytönen (27 May 1933 – 22 December 2020) was a Finnish ice hockey player. He competed in the men's tournament at the 1952 Winter Olympics.

References

1933 births
2020 deaths
Finnish ice hockey forwards
Ice hockey players at the 1952 Winter Olympics
Ice hockey people from Tampere
Olympic ice hockey players of Finland